Lego Star Wars: Terrifying Tales is a 2021 animated special based on the Star Wars franchise, and produced by Lucasfilm Animation and The Lego Group alongside Atomic Cartoons. Like The Lego Star Wars Holiday Special, it is directed by Ken Cunningham from a script written by David Shayne. A stand-alone sequel to the Star Wars sequel trilogy, the special was released on Disney+ on  October 1, 2021.

Plot 
Following the events of Star Wars: The Rise of Skywalker, Poe Dameron and BB-8 make an emergency landing on the volcanic planet Mustafar, where they meet Graballa the Hutt. The crime boss has purchased Darth Vader's castle and is renovating it into the galaxy's first all-inclusive Sith-inspired luxury hotel. While waiting for his X-Wing to be repaired, Poe, BB-8, Graballa, and Dean (a plucky and courageous young boy who works as Graballa's mechanic) venture deep into the mysterious castle with Vader's loyal servant, Vaneé. Along the way, Vaneé shares three creepy stories linked to ancient artifacts and iconic villains from across all eras of Star Wars. As Vaneé spins his tales and lures our heroes deeper into the shadowy underbelly of the castle, a sinister plan emerges. With the help of Dean, Poe and BB-8 will have to face their fears, stop an ancient evil from rising, and escape to make it back to their friends.

Voice cast

Release 
It was released on Disney+ on was released on October 1, 2021, exclusively on Disney+.

Marketing

Reception

References

External links

Lego Star Wars films